Émile Hilaire Amagat (2 January 1841, Saint-Satur – 15 February 1915) was a French physicist. His doctoral thesis, published in 1872, expanded on the work of Thomas Andrews, and included plots of the isotherms of carbon dioxide at high pressures. Amagat published a paper in 1877 that contradicted the current understanding at the time, concluding that the coefficient of compressibility of fluids decreased with increasing pressure. He continued to publish data on isotherms for a number of different gases between 1879 and 1882, and invented the hydraulic manometer, which was able to withstand up to 3200 atmospheres, as opposed to 400 atmospheres using a glass apparatus. In 1880 he published his law of partial volumes, now known as Amagat's law.

For his studies, he developed many original piezometer devices. His originality went so far as to use the depth of a mine shaft being drilled to reach high pressures of 430 atmospheres in order to study the equations of state of certain gases. His expertise led him to collaborate with the physicist Peter Tait in the development of a piezometer suitable for measuring the compressibility of liquids.

Amagat was elected a member of the French Academy of Sciences on 9 June 1902. A unit of number density, amagat, was named after him. He was elected a foreign member of the Royal Society of London in 1897.

The French Academy of Sciences gave him the posthumous award of the Prix Jean Reynaud for 1915.

In film
 In 2016 Polish film Marie Curie, Amagat was played by Daniel Olbrychski.

References

External links
 

1841 births
1915 deaths
People from Cher (department)
Members of the Ligue de la patrie française
Foreign Members of the Royal Society
Honorary Fellows of the Royal Society of Edinburgh
Members of the French Academy of Sciences